This article contains a representative list of notable databases and search engines useful in an academic setting for finding and accessing articles in academic journals, institutional repositories, archives, or other collections of scientific and other articles. Databases and search engines differ substantially in terms of coverage and retrieval qualities. Users need to account for qualities and limitations of databases and search engines, especially those searching systematically for records such as in systematic reviews or meta-analyses. As the distinction between a database and a search engine is unclear for these complex document retrieval systems, see:

 the general list of search engines for all-purpose search engines that can be used for academic purposes
 the article about bibliographic databases for information about databases giving bibliographic information about finding books and journal articles.

The terms "free", "subscription", and "free & subscription" will refer to the availability of the website as well as the journal articles used. Furthermore, some programs are only partly free (for example, accessing abstracts or a small number of items), whereas complete access is prohibited (login or institutional subscription required).

The "Size" column denotes the number of documents (articles, publications, datasets, preprints) rather than the number of citations or references. The database itself should be the primary source of statistics, and if it is not accessible, the independent estimates released as journal papers should be. Notably, Google Scholar does not offer such detail, but the database's size has been calculated.

Operating services

Full-text aggregators 

The main academic full-text databases are open archives or link-resolution services, although others operate under different models such as mirroring or hybrid publishers. Such services typically provide access to full text and full-text search, but also metadata about items for which no full text is available.

This list focuses on general-purpose services; OpenDOAR can be used to find thousands of open-access repositories. The table is sorted by the number of works for which full-text is made available.

Metadata services

Smaller metadata services 

Services with less than a million searchable records.

Publishers 

Content by most academic publishers is indexed by CrossRef, DOAJ and/or DataCite. Some publishers are also listed separately in the table below.

Services no longer operating
The following services are no longer operating;  this may be because they were not updated, abandoned entirely, replaced by other, etc.

See also 

 Academic publishing
 List of digital library projects
 List of educational video websites
 List of neuroscience databases
 List of online databases
 List of online encyclopedias
 List of open access journals
 List of preprint repositories

References 

Databases
 
Internet-related lists

Bibliographic databases and indexes
 Databases
Lists of websites
Database-related lists